Murtuz Najaf oglu Alasgarov (September 20, 1928 – August 7, 2012), also spelled as Murtuz Aleskerov, was an Azerbaijani politician who served as the Speaker of the National Assembly of Azerbaijan from 1996 to 2005.

Early life
Alasgarov was born on September 20, 1928 in Ganja, Azerbaijan. He graduated from Law Department of the Azerbaijan State University. From 1954, he was the Senior Professor and then Dean of the Law Department of Azerbaijan State University, from 1957 he was the Dean of International Law Department. From 1965, he was the Director of the Department of Constitutional Law at the same university. In 1993–1996, he was the Rector of Baku State University. Alasgarov was also an Honorary Doctor of the Kiev State University.

Political career
He was elected to the National Assembly of Azerbaijan in the 1995 parliamentary elections and re-elected in the 2000 parliamentary elections. On October 16, 1996 he was elected the Speaker of the National Assembly by the members of the parliament and re-elected on November 24, 2000. He was then replaced by Ogtay Asadov in December 2005. In the 2005 parliamentary elections, Alasgarov was re-elected to the parliament from Garadag district of Baku.

He was also the Deputy Chairman of the New Azerbaijan Party. According to media reports, Alasgarov's health was deteriorating due to diabetes, which is why he did not run for re-election in November 2010.

Works and awards
He has been awarded with İstiqlal (Sovereignty) order, Honorary Diploma of Azerbaijani President award of Azerbaijan, Содружество order of CIS and Order of Friendship of Russia, Gold Medal from WOSCO (World Organization for Scientific Cooperation). He has authored over 30 scientific publications, textbooks and over 200 scientific articles. Alasgarov was a member of Azerbaijani Lawyers and International Law Associations.
Alasgarov was fluent in English and Russian.

He was married and had three children.

He died in Baku in 2012 after a long illness.

See also
Cabinet of Azerbaijan
Government of Azerbaijan

References 

1928 births
2012 deaths
Members of the National Assembly (Azerbaijan)
Politicians from Ganja, Azerbaijan
Chairmen of the National Assembly (Azerbaijan)
Recipients of the Istiglal Order